Liberty is a city in Montgomery County, Kansas, United States.  As of the 2020 census, the population of the city was 99.

History
Liberty was laid out in 1869 about six miles southeast of Independence, Kansas.  It is named for the popular American ideal of liberty. When the railroad was built through the county in 1870, Liberty relocated to its present site. The first post office in Liberty was established in May 1870.

Geography
Liberty is located at  (37.156211, -95.598001).

Climate
The climate in this area is characterized by hot, humid summers and generally mild to cool winters.  According to the Köppen Climate Classification system, Liberty has a humid subtropical climate, abbreviated "Cfa" on climate maps.

Demographics

2010 census
As of the census of 2010, there were 123 people, 58 households, and 36 families residing in the city. The racial makeup of the city was 91.1% White, 1.6% Native American, and 7.3% from two or more races. Hispanic or Latino of any race were 1.6% of the population.

There were 58 households, of which 27.6% had children under the age of 18 living with them, 48.3% were married couples living together, 8.6% had a female householder with no husband present, 5.2% had a male householder with no wife present, and 37.9% were non-families. 36.2% of all households were made up of individuals, and 15.5% had someone living alone who was 65 years of age or older. The average household size was 2.12 and the average family size was 2.72.

The median age in the city was 41.5 years. 23.6% of residents were under the age of 18; 6.5% were between the ages of 18 and 24; 22% were from 25 to 44; 30.1% were from 45 to 64; and 17.9% were 65 years of age or older. The gender makeup of the city was 50.4% male and 49.6% female.

2000 census
As of the census of 2000, there were 95 people, 50 households, and 29 families residing in the city. The racial makeup of the city was 85.26% White, 1.05% African American, 8.42% Native American, and 5.26% from two or more races.

There were 50 households, out of which 18.0% had children under the age of 18 living with them, 48.0% were married couples living together, 10.0% had a female householder with no husband present, and 42.0% were non-families. 40.0% of all households were made up of individuals, and 18.0% had someone living alone who was 65 years of age or older. The average household size was 1.90 and the average family size was 2.52.

In the city, the population was spread out, with 15.8% under the age of 18, 8.4% from 18 to 24, 22.1% from 25 to 44, 30.5% from 45 to 64, and 23.2% who were 65 years of age or older. The median age was 46 years. For every 100 females, there were 102.1 males. For every 100 females age 18 and over, there were 105.1 males.

The median income for a household in the city was $23,750, and the median income for a family was $32,500. Males had a median income of $26,667 versus $19,375 for females. The per capita income for the city was $14,917. There were 9.4% of families and 13.5% of the population living below the poverty line, including 33.3% of under eighteens and 8.3% of those over 64.

Education
The community is served by Coffeyville USD 445 public school district.

References

Further reading

External links
 Liberty - Directory of Public Officials
 Liberty city map, KDOT

Cities in Kansas
Cities in Montgomery County, Kansas